The John Tillinghast House is an historic colonial house in Newport, Rhode Island. It is a -story wood-frame structure, built in 1760 for John Tillinghast, a wealthy merchant. A high-quality example of academic Georgian architecture, the house was a (often temporary) home for a number of notable people during and after the American Revolutionary War. It was probably occupied by the Marquis de Chastellux, an engineer in the French Army while he was stationed in Newport, and by General Nathanael Greene, who hosted George Washington and the Marquis de Lafayette on a visit to Newport. From 1821 to 1824 it was home to William C. Gibbs while he was Governor of Rhode Island.

The house was listed on the National Register of Historic Places on April 11, 1973.

See also
National Register of Historic Places listings in Newport County, Rhode Island

References

External links

Houses on the National Register of Historic Places in Rhode Island
Houses in Newport, Rhode Island
National Register of Historic Places in Newport, Rhode Island
Houses completed in 1760